The year 1806 in architecture involved some significant events.

Buildings and structures

Buildings

January 30 – The original span of the Lower Trenton Bridge over the Delaware River in the United States is opened.
August 15 – Construction work starts on the Arc de Triomphe in Paris, commissioned by Napoleon Bonaparte from Jean Chalgrin. Also this year a competition for design of a Temple de la Gloire de la Grande Armée is won by Claude Étienne de Beaumont but Napoleon instead commissions Pierre-Alexandre Vignon to construct what will become La Madeleine, Paris.
December 1 – The Olympic Theatre opens in Drury Lane, London.
December 6 – The African Meeting House (Boston, Massachusetts), designed by Asher Benjamin, is dedicated.
The Old West Church (Boston, Massachusetts), designed by Asher Benjamin, is built.
The Circular Congregational Church in Charleston, South Carolina, designed by Robert Mills, is completed.
The Basílica del Juramento de San Rafael in Córdoba, Andalusia, is completed.
Iglesia de la Inmaculada in Heredia, Costa Rica, is completed at about this date.
Latrobe Gate to Washington Navy Yard in Washington, D.C., designed by Benjamin Henry Latrobe, is completed.
Gore Place, Waltham, Massachusetts, probably incorporating designs by Joseph-Guillaume Legrand, is completed.
Württembergisches Palais in Regensburg, Bavaria, is completed by Emanuel Herigoyen.
Sándor Palace, Budapest, designed by Mihály Pollack, is completed.
New Sloswicke's Hospital in Retford, Nottinghamshire, England, is built.
New Royal Military Academy, Woolwich, England, designed by James Wyatt, is opened.
The Admiralty building, Saint Petersburg is designed by Andreyan Zakharov; it will be completed in 1823 after his death.
Rosneath House in Scotland, designed by Joseph Bonomi the Elder is finished.
Demolition of al-Baqi.

Awards
 Grand Prix de Rome, architecture: Jean-Baptiste Desdeban.

Births

April 9 – Isambard Kingdom Brunel, English civil engineer (died 1859)
October 14 – Niels Sigfred Nebelong, Danish historicist architect (died 1871)
November 23 – Philipp Hoffmann, German architect and builder (died 1889)

Deaths
June 17 – Henry Holland, English architect to the British aristocracy (born 1745)
November 18 – Claude Nicolas Ledoux, French neoclassical architect (born 1736)

References

Architecture
Years in architecture
19th-century architecture